Tiểu Cần is a rural district of Trà Vinh province in the Mekong Delta region of Vietnam. As of 2003 the district had a population of 108,718. The district covers an area of 220 km². The district capital lies at Tiểu Cần.

References

Districts of Trà Vinh province